Rest Plaus Historic District is a national historic district located at Marbletown in Ulster County, New York.  The district includes 55 contributing buildings, four contributing sites, 10 contributing structures, and one contributing object. It encompasses mostly undeveloped open space that has been in continuous agricultural use for over 250 years. Most of the land is in four principal farms.

It was listed on the National Register of Historic Places in 1995.

References

National Register of Historic Places in Ulster County, New York
Historic districts on the National Register of Historic Places in New York (state)
Federal architecture in New York (state)
Historic districts in Ulster County, New York